This is a list of career achievements by Danish tennis player Caroline Wozniacki. To date, she has won 30 singles titles including a Grand Slam title, a WTA Finals title, three WTA Premier Mandatory titles and three WTA Premier 5 titles. She was the winner of the 2018 Australian Open and the 2017 WTA Finals, and the runner-up at the 2009 US Open, the 2010 WTA Tour Championships, and the 2014 US Open. Wozniacki was first ranked world No. 1 by the WTA on October 11, 2010.

Records

Grand Slam
By winning the 2018 Australian Open, she became the first Danish player, man or woman, to win a Grand Slam singles title.
At the 2018 Australian Open, she saved two match points against Jana Fett in the second round before she snatched the title, making her the ninth woman to win the title after being match point down.

Ranking
By winning the 2010 China Open, she became the fifth player to reach the No. 1 position without having won a Grand Slam tournament. She also became the first Danish player, man or woman, to reach the top ranking.
By winning the 2018 Australian Open, she regained the world No. 1 ranking on 29 January 2018. Wozniacki was last ranked No. 1 on 29 January 2012, exactly 6 years ago, and her new ascension beat Serena Williams' previous record of 5 years 29 days.

Prize money and earnings
Wozniacki is the fourth highest female player in prize money of all time.
Wozniacki was the fourth female player to win US$30,000,000 in career prize money on 19 February 2018.

Other
Wozniacki won at least one title in 11 consecutive years from 2008 to 2018.  this is the fifth highest overall in the Open Era, shared with Virginia Wade, Evonne Goolagong and Serena Williams.

Recognition
In celebration of the 50th anniversary of the Open Era in tennis (1968–2018), Tennis Magazine published a series "The 50 Greatest Players of the Open Era", rating the best 25 men and 25 women. They ranked Wozniacki as the 24th-best female player two days after she won the 2018 Australian Open.

Awards

{|class=wikitable
!Year
!Awards
!
|-
|align=center|2008
|WTA Tour Most Impressive Newcomer of the Year
|
|-
|rowspan=2 align=center|2010
|ITF Player of the Year
|align=center|
|-
|Danish Sports Name of the Year
|align=center|
|-
|align=center|2011
|Diamond Aces
|
|-
|align=center|2014
|US Open Sportsmanship Award
|
|-
|align=center|2015
|Diamond Aces
|
|-
|align=center|2018
|Danish Sports Name of the Year
|
|}

Outside tennis

Marathon
On 2 November 2014, Wozniacki made her marathon debut, completing the New York City Marathon in a time of 3:26:33. This time was good enough to qualify for the 2016 Boston Marathon but Wozniacki said she will not run another marathon for a few years.

Modeling
Wozniacki appeared in the 2015 Sports Illustrated Swimsuit Issue, following other number one-ranked singles tennis stars: Steffi Graf (1997), Serena Williams (2004), Venus Williams (2005), Maria Sharapova (2006), Ana Ivanovic (2010) and Rafael Nadal (2012) who have appeared in the issue.

Olympics flagbearer
In the 2016 Summer Olympics, Wozniacki was the Denmark flag bearers at the opening ceremony.

Knighthood
In May 2018, Wozniacki was appointed Knight of the Order of the Dannebrog by the Queen of Denmark.

Longest winning streak

Wozniacki performed a 13-match win streak in the 2010 US Open Series, which is the second longest of the 2010 season.

See also

 2018 Caroline Wozniacki tennis season
 List of flag bearers for Denmark at the Olympics
 List of WTA number 1 ranked tennis players
 WTA Tour records

References

External links
 Official website
 Caroline Wozniacki at the Women's Tennis Association
 Caroline Wozniacki at the International Tennis Federation
 Caroline Wozniacki at the Fed Cup
 Caroline Wozniacki on IMDb
 Caroline Wozniacki at the International Olympic Committee
 Caroline Wozniacki at Olympics at Sports-Reference.com

Achievements
Wozniacki, Caroline